Lone Star is a former settlement in Humboldt County, California.

As of 1873, a school was in operation at Lone Star. It was later amalgamated with the Kneeland School.

References

Former settlements in Humboldt County, California
Former populated places in California